Ferguson Township is the name of some places in the U.S. state of Pennsylvania:
Ferguson Township, Centre County, Pennsylvania
Ferguson Township, Clearfield County, Pennsylvania

Pennsylvania township disambiguation pages